The Prophet was a local Latter Day Saint newspaper published in New York City, New York, United States. The first editor of the paper was William Smith and the periodical was printed from 1844 to 1845.

The paper was likely founded as part of Joseph Smith's presidential campaign.  It resembled other contemporary Mormon newspapers, from which it often published excerpts.  Other editors included George T. Leach, Samuel Brannan, A. E. Wright, and Parley P. Pratt.  In July 1845 the paper's format and name changed to become the New-York Messenger, which lasted until the end of the year.

See also 

The Evening and the Morning Star
Messenger and Advocate
Elders' Journal
Millennial Star
List of Latter Day Saint periodicals
Succession crisis (Latter Day Saints)

Notes

References 
.

External links 
 The Prophet (HTML) partial archive
 The Prophet Full Scans

Defunct newspapers published in New York City
Defunct weekly newspapers
Publications disestablished in 1845
Publications established in 1844
The Church of Jesus Christ of Latter-day Saints periodicals
Weekly newspapers published in the United States
1844 in Christianity
19th-century Mormonism